John Ratcliff (31 December 1848 – 11 August 1925) was an English cricketer. Ratcliff was a right-handed batsman who occasionally played as a wicket-keeper. He was born at Richmond-upon-Thames, Surrey.

Ratcliff made his first-class debut for Surrey against Gloucestershire at The Oval in 1876. He made three further first-class appearances for Surrey in that season, against Middlesex, the Marylebone Cricket Club, and Sussex. In his four first-class appearances, he scored a total of 69 runs at an average of 8.62, with a high score of 27.

He died at Twickenham, Middlesex on 11 August 1925.

References

External links

1848 births
1925 deaths
People from Richmond, London
English cricketers
Surrey cricketers